Richard FitzPatrick, 1st Baron Gowran (died 9 June 1727) was a British naval captain.

Life
He was the second son of John Fitzpatrick of Castletown, Queen's County, by Elizabeth, fourth daughter of Thomas Butler, Viscount Thurles, and relict of James Purcell of Loughmoe.

In February 1690–1, he drove on shore two French frigates and helped to cut out fourteen merchantmen from a convoy of twenty-two. In command of the 70-gun , he served under Lord Berkeley in 1696, and in July was detached to make a descent on the Groix, an island near Belle Île, off the west coast of Brittany, from which he brought off thirteen hundred head of cattle, with horses, boats, and small vessels. He was promoted to the command of the 80-gun  on the outbreak of the War of the Spanish Succession, and took part in James Butler, 2nd Duke of Ormonde's mismanaged expedition against Cadiz in 1702, and in the successful attack on Vigo which followed; but soon after retired from the service.

In 1696, he had received a grant of the town and lands of Grantstown and other lands in Queen's County by King William III in consideration of their faithful services, and entered the Irish House of Commons in 1713 as the member for Queen's County until he was raised to the Irish peerage on 27 April 1715 as Baron Gowran of Gowran, Kilkenny. He took his seat on 12 November, and on 14 November helped to prepare an address to the king congratulating him upon his accession. He died on 9 June 1727.

Family
Fitzpatrick married in 1718 Anne, younger daughter of Sir John Robinson of Farmingwood, Northamptonshire, by whom he had two sons, John and Richard. The widowed Lady Gowran lived with her son John in Grosvenor Square.
John was later promoted to the Irish earldom of Upper Ossory on 5 October 1751, and was father of Richard Fitzpatrick.

Notes

References
Attribution
; Endnotes:
Charnock's Biography. Navalis, ii. 134–8
Burchell's Naval History, pages 545, 547
Luttrell's Relation of State Affairs, ii. 80, 435
Hist. Reg. Chronicles Diary (1727), page 23
Lodge's Peerage of Ireland (Archdall), ii. 347.

Year of birth missing
1727 deaths
People from County Laois
17th-century Irish people
Barons in the Peerage of Ireland
Peers of Ireland created by George I
Richard
Members of the Privy Council of Ireland
Members of the Parliament of Ireland (pre-1801) for Queen's County constituencies
Irish MPs 1713–1714
Royal Navy officers
Irish sailors
Irish sailors in the Royal Navy